The Reconstructionist Journal was a Jewish magazine published by the Reconstructionist Rabbinical Association.

History
In 1935, the favorable reception to Rabbi Mordecai Kaplan's book Judaism as a Civilization inspired Kaplan to launch a magazine, The Reconstructionist, for the Reconstructionist movement. The magazine was established by Mordecai Kaplan, Milton Steinberg, Eugene Kohn, and Ira Eisenstein. It was renamed The Reconstructionist Journal in 1996 and ceased publication in 2007.

References

External links
The Reconstructionist Journal

1935 establishments in the United States
2007 disestablishments in the United States
Jewish magazines published in the United States
Reconstructionist Judaism in the United States